Chinese Garden MRT station is an above-ground Mass Rapid Transit (MRT) station on the East–West line in Jurong East, Singapore. It primarily serves the residential estate of Yuhua, as well as the various tourist attractions in Jurong Lake, including the Chinese Garden, where the station derived its name from.

The roof of Chinese Garden station is based on traditional Chinese architectural design.

History

The station was opened on 5 November 1988, as part of the first portion of Phase 2 of the MRT system.

As with most of the stations along the East–West line, it was built with platform screen doors to prevent commuters from falling onto the train tracks. After several successful test at Jurong East, Yishun and Pasir Ris and eventually, installation of the half-height platform screen doors started on 14 August 2010 and operations commenced on 1 October 2010.

The station was installed with high-volume low-speed fans, which commenced operations on 16 November 2012.

References

External links
 

Railway stations in Singapore opened in 1988
Jurong East
Mass Rapid Transit (Singapore) stations